In computing, move is a command in various command-line interpreters (shells) such as COMMAND.COM, cmd.exe, 4DOS/4NT, and PowerShell. It is used to move one or more files or directories from one place to another. The original file is deleted, and the new file may have the same or a different name. The command is analogous to the Unix mv command and to the OpenVOS move_file and move_dircommands.

Implementations
The command is available in DOS, IBM OS/2, Microsoft Windows and ReactOS. On MS-DOS, the command is available in versions 6 and later. In Windows PowerShell,  is a predefined command alias for the Move-Item Cmdlet which basically serves the same purpose. The FreeDOS version was developed by Joe Cosentino. DR DOS 6.0 includes an implementation of the  command. The open-source MS-DOS emulator DOSBox has no MOVE command. Instead, the REN command can be used to move files.

Syntax
To move one or more files:
 MOVE [/Y | /-Y] [drive:][path]filename1[,...] destination

To rename a directory:
 MOVE [/Y | /-Y] [drive:][path]dirname1 [destination\]dirname2

To move a directory:
 MOVE [/Y | /-Y] [drive:][path]dirname1 destination

Parameters
 [drive:][path]filename1: Specifies the location and name of the file or files you want to move.
 destination: Specifies the new location of the file or directory. Destination can consist of a drive letter and colon, a directory name, or a combination, and must already exist. If you are moving only one file, you can also include a filename if you want to rename the file when you move it.
 [drive:][path]dirname1: Specifies the directory you want to rename or move.
 dirname2: Specifies the new name of the directory.
 /Y: Suppresses prompting to confirm you want to overwrite an existing destination file.
 /-Y: Causes prompting to confirm you want to overwrite an existing destination file.

The switch /Y may be present in the COPYCMD environment variable. This may be overridden with /-Y on the command line. Default is to prompt on overwrites unless MOVE command is being executed from within a batch script.

Notes
 When moving a directory, dirname1 and its contents wind up as a subfolder beneath destination.  Caution is advised - if the final subfolder of the destination path does not exist, dirname1 will be both moved and renamed.

See also
List of DOS commands
List of Unix commands

References

Further reading

External links

move | Microsoft Docs

External DOS commands
OS/2 commands
ReactOS commands
Windows commands
Microcomputer software
MSX-DOS commands
Windows administration